Joana Mascarenhas de Lemos (born 24 April 1972 ) is a former Portuguese rally raid racer. She raced on motorcycles between 1990 and 1995 and automobiles between 1996 and 2004. When she ended her racing career in 2006, she maintained her connection to sport, this time as an organizer of major sporting events, being largely responsible for the two editions of the Lisbon-Dakar Rally. Since 2012, she is Head of the Family Office of Maude Queiroz Pereira.

Biography
Lemos started doing sports at the age of six. She did swimming, tennis, gymnastics and fell in love with the mini-trampoline. Then the bikes came. But her father still tried to divert her into horseback riding. It didn't work and Lemos' future was even in motor sports. First on mini-motorbikes, at the same time that Pedro Lamy was also taking his first steps in the same discipline, followed by motorcycling and later motoring.

After taking part in the first off-road rides in 1990, Lemos began her racing career, first on motorcycles and then in automobiles. She was the first Portuguese driver to compete in desert races and the youngest in the world to finish the Paris-Dakar Ladies Cup in a car, a race she won in 1997, alongside Carine Duret and behind the wheel of a Nissan Patrol. The car with which she achieved this feat even deserved a toy-shaped replica. Among her best results, to highlight the achievement of the 1999 Rally de Portugal, in a golden edition of the men's event, which had on the podium Colin McRae and Nicky Grist (1st), Carlos Sainz and Luis Moya (2nd) and Didier Auriol and Denis Giraudet (3rd).

Lemos has two sons, Tomás and Martim, from her first marriage to Portuguese banker Manuel da Costa Lobo Reymão Nogueira. On October 7, 2021, she got married a second time to Lapo Elkann, an Italian businessman heir and member of the prominent Agnelli family.

References

1973 births
Living people
Sportspeople from Lisbon
Portuguese motorcycle racers
Portuguese rally drivers
Enduro riders
People from Esposende
Off-road motorcycle racers
Dakar Rally drivers
Dakar Rally motorcyclists
Female motorcycle racers
Female racing drivers